Boldwin Hansen (born 26 March 2001) is a South African rugby union player for the  in the Currie Cup. His regular position is wing or fullback.

Hansen was named in the  side for the 2022 Currie Cup Premier Division.

References

South African rugby union players
Living people
Rugby union wings
Rugby union fullbacks
Golden Lions players
2001 births